Squillace is an ancient town and  in the Province of Catanzaro, part of Calabria, Southern Italy.

Squillace is situated near the east coast of Calabria, facing the shores of the eponymous Gulf of Squillace, which indents the coast of Calabria on the east as deeply as that of the Gulf of Saint Euphemia does on the west, with a comparatively narrow isthmus between them.facing the eponymous gulf.

History
Squillace is known today as one of Italy's most important archaeological sites as well as a popular resort. The name derives from the ancient city of Scylletium, the principal ruins of which are located in the nearby comune of  Borgia. The Roman statesman and writer Cassiodorus founded a monastery called Vivarium on his family estates on the shores of the Ionian Sea in the 6th century AD. This monastery was on the site of the modern Santa Maria de Vetere near Squillace.

Medieval and early modern history
 The modern town was founded as a Byzantine fortress during the Byzantine reconquest of Italy (6th–8th century).
 During the Middle Ages it was subject to frequent raids by Saracens, who made it for a short time a strong military base.
 After the brief Arab rule, the city fell under Norman hegemony. Its strategic military role, already recognised by the Greeks, was also recognised by the Normans who in 1044 built a castle and transformed the settlement into a county.
 During the Kingdom of Sicily, with the lordship of Roger of Lauria, Squillace passed first to Robert of Anjou and to the counts of Monfort, then for one hundred and fifty years the city was ruled by the counts of Marzano.
 In 1445, it reverted to the Aragonese Kings of Naples but passed by marriage to the infamous House of Borgia, who ruled the city as Princes of Squillace from 1494 to 1735.
 Gioffre Borgia (1482–1516), son of Pope Alexander VI and younger brother of Cesare Borgia and Lucrezia Borgia, married  Sancia (Sancha) of Aragon, daughter of Alfonso II of Naples.  Gioffre thereby obtained both the Principality of Squillace (1494) and the Duchy of Alvito (1497) as his wife's dowry.
 Although Gioffre was deprived of Alvito after the death of Sancia in 1506, he managed to retain Squillace. He subsequently married Maria de Mila, and passed it on to their son Francesco Borgia.
 The Borgia Princes were: Gioffre, Francesco, Giovanni, Pietro and, finally, Anna that on whose death, paed to Francisco de Borja y Aragón and last to his brother Fernando de Borja y Aragón. Living either in Naples or in Spain, the Borgias ruled their fief through governors.
 Under the Bourbons, Squillace was downgraded to a Marquisate and granted in 1755 to the Marquis Leopoldo de Gregorio, a nobleman from Messina who was to be the last feudal lord of Squillace.

Ceramics
Production of highly prized terra cotta has been an important part the local economy for centuries; Cassiodorus makes several mentions of it in his writings. Squillace is the home of the pignatari style of ceramic artistry. The name is derived from the Italian word pignata, an earthenware container used for cooking beans over an open fire.

Notable people
 Cassiodorus
 Florestano Pepe
 Guglielmo Pepe

References

External links

Archaeological sites in Italy
Cities and towns in Calabria